Raymond Gordon "Ray" Stokes (21 May 1924 – 26 February 2017) was an Australian rules footballer who played with Richmond in the Victorian Football League (VFL). He was born in Longford.

After making his debut for Richmond in the 1946 season, Stokes went on to play with the club for six years. He played in the midfield, as either a centreman or on the wing. Stokes had been recruited from Burnie in Tasmania and he returned there after leaving Richmond and became their coach. He represented the Tasmanian interstate side at the 1953 Adelaide and 1956 Perth carnivals.

Stokes was also a cricketer and played first-class cricket for Tasmania. A left-handed batsman, he played nine first-class matches in total, scoring 323 runs at 24.84 with a highest score of 83. He was the older brother of Richmond footballer Jervis Stokes.

See also
 List of Tasmanian representative cricketers

References

Cricinfo profile

1924 births
2017 deaths
Richmond Football Club players
Burnie Football Club players
Australian rules footballers from Tasmania
Tasmanian Football Hall of Fame inductees
Australian cricketers
Tasmania cricketers